The 2023 Campeonato Paraense is the 111th edition of Pará's top professional football league. The competition started on 21 January and ended on 3 April.

Format
Three groups with four clubs, with the teams of one group facing those of the other two. The eight best teams in the overall standings advance to the final stage. The matches of the quarter-finals, semi-finals, third place play-offs and the finals will be played on a home-and-away two-legged basis.

The two worst teams in the overall standings will be relegated to the 2024 Campeonato Paraense Second Division.

The champion and the runner-up qualify to the 2024 Copa Verde. The champion, the runner-up and the 3rd-placed team qualify to the 2024 Copa do Brasil. The best two teams who isn't on Campeonato Brasileiro Série A, Série B or Série C qualifies to 2024 Campeonato Brasileiro Série D.

Participating teams

Managerial changes

Group stage

Group A

Group B

Group C

References

Pará
2023 in Brazilian football
Campeonato Paraense